Ferrante Amendola (1664-1724) was an Italian historical painter, active in Naples.

Biography
He studied under Francesco Solimena, in whose style he painted for some time, but afterwards imitated that of Luca Giordano. He painted many works at Naples, among them two altar-pieces in the Church of the Madonna di Montevergine. Nagler mentions an ingenious picture, by this artist, of a Quack Doctor's Shop in the Royal Gallery at Munich. Bernardo de Dominici says that Amendola's chief merit consisted in a practical facility of coloring, and that he completely failed in his attempt to imitate the masterly style of Giordano, especially in the draperies.

References

1664 births
1724 deaths
17th-century Italian painters
Italian male painters
18th-century Italian painters
Painters from Naples
Italian Baroque painters
Place of birth unknown
18th-century Italian male artists